John Eyles is the name of:

John Eyles (MP for Devizes) (died 1703), MP for Devizes
Sir John Eyles, 2nd Baronet (1683–1745), MP for Chippenham and City of London
Sir John Haskins Eyles-Stiles, 4th Baronet (1741–1768) of the Eyles-Stiles baronets
Lieutenant-Colonel John Eyles Blundell, Companion of The Most Honourable Order of the Bath, see 1897 Diamond Jubilee Honours
John D. Eyles (born 1946), Canadian geographer